is a Japanese language term used to refer to a person ethnically half Japanese and half non-Japanese. A loanword from English, the term literally means "half," a reference to the individual's non-Japanese heritage. The word can also be used to describe anyone with mixed-racial ancestry in general. Japan remains one of the most homogeneous societies on the planet, which puts children of non-Japanese parents in a unique and difficult position, as they are called hāfu Japanese. Hāfu individuals are well represented in Japanese media and abroad, and recent studies in the 2010s estimate that 1 in 30 children born in Japan are born to interracial couples.

Related terms

In Japanese
It was historically often associated with discriminating sentiment. Almost never used today in Japan.
  – A daburu is an alternative to Hāfu that focuses on the positive connotations of two cultures instead of one.
  – A konketsuji is a Japanese person with one non-Japanese parent. It is considered a derogatory term.
  – A kwōtā is a Japanese person with one non-Japanese grandparent. The term is a loanword, based on the English word quarter and refers to an individual's 25%, or one quarter, Japanese ancestry.

In other languages
 Japinoy – A person of mixed Japanese and Filipino ancestry.
 Afro-Asian (also Blasian) – An Afro-Asian is an individual of African and Asian ancestry. Blasian, a portmanteau of Black and Asian, is a slang term and is regularly used among English speakers in North America.
 Ainoco (f. Ainoca) – An ainoco is an individual with one Japanese parent. The term is a loanword, based on the Japanese word  and is used by Portuguese speakers in Brazil and Pohnpeian speakers in Micronesia, both countries with a sizable Japanese populations.
 Amerasian – An Amerasian is an individual of American and Asian, especially East Asian ancestry. Historically, the term referred to children born to local women and American servicemen stationed in East Asia during the Korean and Vietnam Wars. It should not be confused with Asian American, which describes an American citizen of full or partial Asian ancestry.
 Eurasian – A Eurasian is an individual of European and Asian ancestry.
 Hapa – A hapa is an individual of mixed Native Hawaiian, Pacific Islander, East Asian and/or Southeast Asian heritage. The term is a loanword, based on the English word half, as hāfu is, but, unlike hāfu , the term does not imply an individual is 50% or half, of a certain race or ethnicity, only that they are mixed race. It is a Hawaiian term, used by English and Hawaiian speakers in Hawaii and California.
 Mestiço de japonês – A mestiço de japonês (lit. Japanese mestiço) or miscigenado de japonês is an individual, usually an eurasiano, with one Japanese parent, i.e. a nipônico citizen, or a nipo-brasileiro. They are Portuguese terms, used in Brazil, but enjoy less popularity than ainoco and hāfu.

History

Prehistoric to feudal Japan
Hāfu refers to a person who has one ethnic Japanese parent and one non-ethnic Japanese parent. The term ethnic Japanese refers to the Indigenous Japanese people of the Japanese archipelago. Over the course of centuries the minority ethnic groups such as the Ainu and Ryukyuans were mostly assimilated into the Yamato population. Mixed race couples and thus hāfu people were rare in feudal Japan. There were mixed Asian couples between ethnic Japanese and other East and Southeast Asian peoples.

The most well-regarded theory is that present-day Yamato Japanese are descendants of both the Indigenous Jōmon people and the immigrant Yayoi people. The Yayoi were an admixture (1,000 BCE–300 CE) of migrants from East Asia (mostly China and the Korean peninsula).

Modern mainland (Yamato) Japanese have less than 20% Jomon people's genomes. In modern Japan, the term Yamato minzoku is seen as antiquated for connoting racial notions that have been discarded in many circles since Japan's surrender in World War II. The term "Japanese people" or even "Japanese-Japanese" are often used instead.

Genetic and anthropological studies indicate that the Ryukyuans are significantly related to the Ainu people and share the ancestry with the indigenous prehistoric Jōmon period (pre 10,000–1,000 BCE) people, who arrived from Southeast Asia and with the Yamato people. During the Meiji period, the Ryukyuans distinct culture was suppressed by the Meiji government and faced forced assimilation.

Early modern period

Edo period (1603–1867)

English sailor William Adams, a navigator for the Dutch East India Company, settled in Japan in April 1600. He was ultimately granted the rank of samurai, one of the few non-Japanese to do so. He wed Oyuki (お雪), a Japanese woman and together, they had two children, Joseph and Susanna, who were hāfu.

Chinese military leader Chenggong Zheng, historically known as Koxinga (1624–1662), was hāfu, born in Japan to a Japanese mother and Chinese father and raised there until the age of seven, known by the Japanese given name, Fukumatsu.

Modern period

Meiji, Taishō and pre-war Shōwa period (1868–1945)
Since 1899, the Ainu were increasingly marginalized. During a period of only 36 years, the Ainu went from being a relatively isolated group of people to having their land, language, religion and customs assimilated into those of the Japanese. Intermarriage between Japanese and Ainu was actively promoted by the Ainu to lessen the chances of discrimination against their offspring. As a result, many Ainu are indistinguishable from their Japanese neighbors, but some Ainu Japanese are interested in traditional Ainu culture.

Contemporary period

Shōwa period (post-war) (1945–1989)

The presence of the United States Armed Forces in Japan and Asia saw the birth of many children born to American fathers; these children were called Amerasians. It's estimated that by 1952, anywhere from 5,000 to 10,000 Japanese children were fathered by American servicemen, with many of the children placed for adoption by their Japanese mothers due to the stigma of out-of-wedlock pregnancy and miscegenation and the struggles of supporting a child alone in post-war Japan. One orphanage, in Yokohama, run by Franciscan nuns, opened in 1946 and, by 1948, staff members were caring for 126 children fathered by American servicemen, by 1950 and 136 children. A letter, dated 1948, detailed an incident of a malnourished infant born to a Japanese teenager whose American father refused to support for fear his wife would learn of his extramarital affair. Another orphanage, opened in Ōiso by a Japanese woman named Miki Sawada, cared for more than 700 Amerasian children, none of whom were visited or supported by their American fathers.

Heisei period (1989–2019)

Fashionable images of the half Japanese people have become prominent especially with the increased appearance of hāfu in the Japanese media. Hāfu models are now seen on television or fill the pages of fashion magazines such as Non-no, CanCam and Vivi as often as newsreaders or celebrities. The appearance of hāfu in the media has provided the basis for such a vivid representation of them in the culture. As of 2018, it is estimated that 30% to 40% of runway models in Japanese fashion shows identify as hafu. Most top models in their 20s of popular Japanese fashion magazines are hafu.

One of the earliest terms referring to half Japanese was ainoko, meaning a child born of a relationship between two races. It is still used in Latin America, most prominently Brazil (where spellings such as ainoco, ainoca (f.) and ainocô may be found), to refer to mestizo (broader term in Hispanic America for mixed race in general) or mestiço people of some Japanese ancestry. In Brazil, amarela (yellow) is generally used for people of East Asian origin. Nevertheless, the former term evolved to be an umbrella term for Eurasian or mixed East Asian/mestizo, East Asian/African, East Asian/Arab and East Asian/indigenous heritage in general. At the same time it is possible for people with little Japanese or other East Asian ancestry to be perceivable just by their phenotype to identify mostly as black, white or mestizo/pardo instead of ainoko, while people with about a quarter or less of non-East Asian ancestry may identify on the Brazilian census as being amarela ("yellow" or East Asian).

Soon this, too, became a taboo term due to its derogatory connotations such as illegitimacy and discrimination. What were central to these labels were the emphasis on "blood impurity" and the obvious separation of the half Japanese from the majority of Japanese. Some English-speaking parents of children of mixed ethnicity use the word "double." Amerasian is another term for children of mixed ancestry, especially those born to Japanese mothers and U.S. military fathers.

Of the one million children born in Japan in 2013, 2.2% had one or more non-Japanese parent.[70] According to the Japanese Ministry of Health, Labor and Welfare, one in forty-nine babies born in Japan today are born into families with one non-Japanese parent. Most intermarriages in Japan are between Japanese men and women from other Asian countries, including China, the Philippines and South Korea. Southeast Asia too, also has significant populations of people with half Japanese ancestry, particularly in the Philippines. 

In the 21st century, stereotyping and discrimination against hāfu occurs based on how different their identity, behavior and appearance is from a typical Japanese person. Some experience negative treatment such as being teased or bullied in junior high school, treated like foreigners or stereotyped as bilingual and models. However, being mixed is increasingly seen as cool. The hafu of international marriages between Japanese and other Asians tend to blend in easier in Japanese society. They can have a bicultural identity. Their foreign side could be suppressed in Japan's homogeneous culture.

 is a television drama series, broadcast by TBS from April to June 2009. Jun Matsumoto plays the lead role of Vito, a half-Filipino, half-Japanese man who always smiles despite all of the problems and difficulties he faces. The series focused on foreigners and mixed race children who suffered from racism.

The documentary film Hafu: The Mixed-Race Experience in Japan was released in April 2013. It is about the experiences of five hāfu living in Japan. It deals with issues of identity, multiculturalism, relationships, hardship and stereotyping that they face.

In September 2018, Naomi Osaka is the first Japanese woman and hāfu to contest a Grand Slam singles final and the first Japanese Grand Slam singles champion. Naomi Osaka is the winner of the 2018 US Open Women's Singles.

Reiwa period (2019–)
Due to low birthrate, the population of Japan is aging significantly. As of 2019, the fertility rate stood at 1.36 children per woman, far below the 2.1 children per woman required to maintain a stable population. Japan had 126.5 million people in 2018, with Japanese nationals numbering 124.8 million in January 2019. Currently, 1 in 4 Japanese residents are over the age of 65, meaning that if the birthrate does not increase, one-third of the population will be above this age by 2050.

The percentage of hāfu is increasing, but the group is still a minority in Japan. The Government of Japan regards all naturalized Japanese citizens and native-born Japanese nationals with multi-ethnic backgrounds as Japanese, with no official ethnicity census data.

Notable hāfu individuals

Hāfu in popular culture

See also

References

Bibliography

Further reading

External links
List includes archived websites.
 Elizabeth Saunders Home Reunion Facebook Page. The Elizabeth Saunders Home in Japan included many Japanese Amerasians (early Hafus).
Hafu Japanese Facebook Page. Active Hafu group with over 7300 members.
Planet Hafu (Half Japanese Facebook Page. Active Hafu group with over 2400 members.
Takuan Amaru – Author. Son of a Black/Native American military man and a Japanese woman.
AmerasianWorld.com's "Salaam Central Asia", by Kevin Miller, Jr., MPA. Calls himself a Japanese Amerasian, not a Hafu.
Biracial Beauty Queen Challenges Japan’s Self-Image, NYT.
Die Kreuzungsstelle – Voices of half Japanese, mixed race/multiracial or multiethnic persons.
Hafu Film.
 . By artist Natalie Maya Willer and researcher Marcia Yumi Lise.
Halvsie
HAPA JAPAN FEST 2017 BIOS – Large list of speakers to the event. 
"“This Is Who I Am”: Jero, Young, Gifted, Polycultural" (Fellezs 2012).

Japanese words and phrases
Japanese culture
Japanese people by ethnic or national origin
Ethno-cultural designations
Multiracial affairs in Asia
Race in Japan